Leslie School District No. 23 or Leslie Public Schools was a school district headquartered in Leslie, Arkansas. It operated the Leslie School a.k.a. the Leslie Public School, which had all grades in a single building; high school students occupied the eastern part of the building while elementary students occupied the western part.  the district had over 40 employees and 240 students. The high school portion of the building included a gymnasium.  The mascot was the bulldog.

History
In 1910 the Leslie school had been established.

Leslie School's class of 1996-1997 had the highest Arkansas Pilot Exit Exam scores in the State of Arkansas.

On July 1, 2004, the Leslie district and the Marshall School District consolidated to form the Searcy County School District, with the Marshall district annexing Leslie. This consolidation occurred because the Leslie district had fewer than 350 students and an Arkansas law passed in 2004 required school districts to have at least 350 students.

References

Further reading
Maps of the district:
 Map of Arkansas School Districts pre-July 1, 2004
  (Download)

External links
 
 
 "Leslie School District No. 23 Searcy County, Arkansas Regulatory Basis Financial Statements And Other Reports June 30, 2004."

Defunct school districts in Arkansas
2004 disestablishments in Arkansas
School districts disestablished in 2004
Education in Searcy County, Arkansas
School districts established in 1910
1910 establishments in Arkansas